Roman Trotsenko (born September 12, 1970) is a Russian billionaire businessman. He is the owner of Aeon Corporation, a Russian investment and management company. According to Forbes, he has an estimated net worth of US$1.6 billion.

Early life
Trotsenko was born into a family of doctors. In 1986, he entered the faculty of socio-economics of the Institute of Asian and African Countries at Moscow State University. He specialized in Japanese economy, and studied Japanese and English.

Career
Trotsenko began his executive career in 1991, when he was selected to be director of finance for the International Medical Exchange. By age 22, he had earned his first million rubles.

He became the president of OSJC United Shipbuilding Corporation in 2009. He served as president until July 1, 2012.

Trotsenko's name was included in the Panama Papers which were leaked in 2016.

In August 2021, Roman Trotensko`s company Carbon together with Stabeck Mishakov, ex-Basovy Element top-manager, founded Arctic Energy Group LLC with respective shares of 70 and %. Carbon company is focused on commercial and administrative consulting. Alexandra Mutovina is named Carbon`s CEO. In December 2021, "Russkaya energia" LLC, where Mr. Trotsenko holds a 70% stake, agreed to buy "Vorkutaugol" of Severstal for 15 billions of roubles.

Personal life
Trotsenko lives with his wife and two children in Moscow. In 2021, it was noticed that Trotsenko purchased a luxurious villa in the Maremma coast, Tuscany.

References

Russian businesspeople in transport
Russian billionaires
1970 births
Living people
Russian investors